The 1984 II ACB International Tournament "I Memorial Héctor Quiroga" was the 2nd semi-official edition of the European Basketball Club Super Cup. It took place at Polideportivo Antonio Magariños, Madrid, Spain, on 22, 23 and 24 September 1984 with the participations of Real Madrid (champions of the 1983–84 FIBA European Cup Winner's Cup), Orthez (champions of the 1983–84 FIBA Korać Cup), Granarolo Bologna (champions of the 1983–84 FIP Serie A1) and Indesit Caserta (runners-up of the 1983–84 FIP Serie A1).

League stage
Day 1, September 21, 1984

|}

Day 2, September 22, 1984

|}

Day 3, September 23, 1984

|}

Final standings 

European Basketball Club Super Cup
1984–85 in European basketball
1984–85 in Spanish basketball
1984–85 in Italian basketball
1984–85 in French basketball
International basketball competitions hosted by Spain